Comăna is a commune in Brașov County, Transylvania, Romania. It is composed of four villages: Comăna de Jos (the commune center), Comăna de Sus (Felsőkomána), Crihalma (Königsberg; Királyhalma) and Ticușu Nou (Rumänisch Tekes; Felsőtyúkos).

Comăna is traversed north to south by the Olt River. It borders the following communes: Părău to the south, Măieruș to the east, Hoghiz to the north, and Ticușu to the west.

History

Comăna de Jos was an important administrative center of the eastern part of Țara Făgărașului, at a time when  – who was born here in 1502 – ruled over Transylvania. Villages falling within the jurisdiction of this center were: Comăna de Sus, Veneția de Jos, Veneția de Jos, Crihalma, Ticușu Nou, Cuciulata, and Lupșa. In the current area of Comăna de Jos, human settlements were discovered that attest to the existence of people in the following places: 
A Bronze Age settlement from the 2nd to the 1st century B.C.  
The La Tène culture is represented by a Hallstatt settlement from the 8th and 9th centuries. 
Settlements from the early medieval era (11th to 13th century).

Important archaeological discoveries.
In Comăna de Jos, it was investigated that dwellings dug into the soil at different depths, being unveiled 14 huts and 18 little huts, with diverse planimetry with installation of fire ovens consisting of stone and clay. Was also found and existing facilities upgraded fire outdoors. Archaeological research from 1974 to 1976 concluded that construction traces, ruins and ceramics (by wheel and by hand) belong to various periods of time. Ceramic found here is similar to the one found in the areas inhabited by the Dacians.

Early census
In 1733, when the Romanian Greek Catholic bishop Inocențiu Micu-Klein decided to organize a census in Transylvania, 34 families were reviewed in the village of Comăna de Jos. In other words, in Comăna de Jos of the year 1733, there were around 170 inhabitants. In the same census is to be noted that in Comăna de Jos there were two Greek Catholic priests, both having the surname Iuon (John). The village had a Greek Catholic church and a manse. The name of the village was written in Hungarian as Alsó-Komana, whereas the results were intended for a committee consisting of non-Romanians, mostly Hungarians.

Population

In 2011, the population of Comăna commune numbered 2,556 inhabitants.

Population between 1850 and 2011, according to the Hungarian and Romanian censuses:

Natives

Ștefan Mailat (1502–1550) – captain of Făgăraș Citadel and Prince of Transylvania.

Gallery

References

External links
The official site of Comăna commune 
An unofficial site of Comăna de Jos

Communes in Brașov County
Localities in Transylvania